TSV Ampfing is a German football club from the city of Ampfing, Bavaria.

History
The club was established 19 May 1927 as the gymnastics club Turn- und Sportverein Ampfing and first formed a football department in 1931. The club was lost in the aftermath of World War II when occupying Allied authorities banned most organizations across the country, including sports and football clubs. It was reestablished 14 September 1949.

TSV was a third division side in the Amateuroberliga Bayern from 1979 to 1989 with the team's best result coming as third-place finish in 1985. Franz Schick, playing for Ampfing in the Oberliga, finished as the league's top-scorer in 1981, 1982, 1985, 1986 and 1988. The club also appeared in the 1979–80 DFB-Pokal, where it was knocked-out in the first round. After finishing 14th in 1989 the club was relegated to the Landesliga Bayern-Süd (IV) where, with the exception of the 1996–97 season spent in the Bezirksoberliga Oberbayern (VI), they would play until 2002. They slipped to the Bezirksliga Oberbayern-Ost (VII) in 2006 and, after winning the title there in 2009, return to the Bezirksoberliga (VII) in 2010.

At the end of the 2011–12 season the club qualified for the promotion round to the newly expanded Landesliga after finishing 12th in the Bezirksoberliga. In this round it earned promotion through a victory in a penalty shoot out over TSV 1860 Rosenheim II. After two difficult seasons in the Landesliga the club was relegated back to the Bezirksliga in 2014. In the 2018–19 season Ampfing earned promotion to the Landesliga again after another Bezirksliga championship.

In addition to its football side the club has departments for gymnastics, karate, skiing, table tennis, and tennis.

Honors

League
 Landesliga Bayern-Süd (IV)
 Champions: 1979
 Bezirksoberliga Oberbayern (VI)
 Champions: 1997
 Bezirksliga Oberbayern-Ost (V-VIII)
 Champions: 1975, 1978, 2009, 2019
 Runners-up: 1976, 2008

Recent seasons
The recent season-by-season performance of the club:

With the introduction of the Bezirksoberligas in 1988 as the new fifth tier, below the Landesligas, all leagues below dropped one tier. With the introduction of the Regionalligas in 1994 and the 3. Liga in 2008 as the new third tier, below the 2. Bundesliga, all leagues below dropped one tier. With the establishment of the Regionalliga Bayern as the new fourth tier in Bavaria in 2012 the Bayernliga was split into a northern and a southern division, the number of Landesligas expanded from three to five and the Bezirksoberligas abolished. All leagues from the Bezirksligas onwards were elevated one tier.

DFB Cup appearances
The club has qualified for the first round of the German Cup only once:

Source:

References

External links
 Official team site  
 TSV Ampfing profile at Weltfussball.de  
 Das deutsche Fußball-Archiv  historical German domestic league tables

Football clubs in Germany
Football clubs in Bavaria
Association football clubs established in 1931
Sports clubs established in 1927
Football in Upper Bavaria
1927 establishments in Germany
Mühldorf (district)